The Instituto de Estudios Superiores de Administración (Institute of Advanced Studies in Administration, IESA) is a private non-profit Venezuelan business school with campuses in Caracas, Maracaibo and Valencia. It was founded in 1965. It has its own publisher, Ediciones IESA.

IESA is considered Venezuela's leading business school, and it played a key role in the neoliberal economic policy of the second administration of Carlos Andrés Pérez (1989 - 1993). A number of academics from it (including Moisés Naím and Ricardo Hausmann) were appointed ministers, and the group became known as the "IESA Boys," in analogy to Chile's Chicago Boys.

IESA is triple accredited by the three leading global business school accreditation associations: AACSB, AMBA and EQUIS. In the 2009 QS Global 200 Business Schools Report the school was ranked 9th in South America.

See also
 :Category:Instituto de Estudios Superiores de Administración faculty

References

External links
 www.iesa.edu.ve

Business schools
Educational institutions established in 1965
Instituto de Estudios Superiores de Administración
1965 establishments in Venezuela